This is a non-exhaustive list of online marketplaces.

References

Marketplaces
online marketplaces